The Escanaba & Lake Superior Railroad  is a Class III shortline railroad that operates  of track in Northeastern Wisconsin and the Upper Peninsula of Michigan. Its main line runs  from Rockland, Michigan, to Green Bay, Wisconsin, and it also owns various branch lines and out-of-service track. In 1897, the Escanaba River Company built a  railroad from Wells, Michigan, to tap a large hardwood timber stand at LaFave’s Hill. In 1898, the company name was changed to the Escanaba & Lake Superior Railway (E&LS).

History

Founding to 1978
Isaac Stephenson, Jefferson Sinclair, Daniel Wells Jr., Harrison Ludington, and Nelson Ludington were the founders of the N. Ludington Company. It was again renamed to the I. Stephenson company when Isaac Stephenson became majority owner in the same year. The N. Ludington Company became part of this company, and along with being rebranded as the Escanaba River Company, became a subsidiary of this new company in 1888. The Escanaba River Co. constructed  to connect the company to hardwood reserves west of Wells and Escanaba. Work began in 1898 to extend the track  from Wells northwest to Watson and was completed in 1899.

This branch was abandoned in 1910. In 1902, the E&LS built  of track southeast out of Wells into the center of Escanaba.

From 1900 to 1903, the railroad extended the mainline track  to Channing. This established a connection with the Chicago, Milwaukee, St. Paul and Pacific Railroad (component of the Milwaukee Road) and began their haulage rights agreement to their ore dock in Escanaba. As part of the agreement that allowed the CMStP&P access to its line, the E&LS was reincorporated as the Escanaba and Lake Superior Railroad for its agreement, which allowed it to reach Ontonagon on Lake Superior; it has used this name ever since. This agreement ran from February 12, 1900 to March 15, 1937.

At this point in the railroad's history, it had connections to both major Class 1 railroads that existed at the time in the UP: The Chicago and North Western and the Milwaukee Road, and was able to diversify its traffic base. This diversification included the Milwaukee Road ore trains mentioned above, bound for the now gone Milwaukee ore docks in Escanaba. The railroad also chartered a mixed passenger train that ran along the existing route up until the late 1950s. This service included run-through mail and express from the Milwaukee Road, and passengers bound north from the Chicago & North Western.

The northernmost portion of this branch that extended  from Gleason was abandoned June 7, 1922. This branch was abandoned in 1939.

Other branch lines were built by the E&LS to get out the remote timber stands: Ralph, Turner (1911–1912), Mashek, and Hendricks (1915).

In 1935, the Milwaukee Road moved its ore trains off the E&LS and entered into an agreement with the Chicago & North Western (C&NW) to jointly operate ore trains into Escanaba. Though the E&LS petitioned the Interstate Commerce Commission (ICC) and later the U.S. Supreme Court to be allowed to join the joint operations, it was blocked from doing so in 1938 by the Supreme Court.

In the 1940s, two major sources of traffic were developed near Escanaba: The Harnischfeger Corporation, which built large cranes for mining operations, and the Escanaba Paper Company. The railroad's transportation of logs ended in 1943 with the closure of the Stephenson mill in Wells. In the early 1960s, the E&LS was purchased by the Hanna Mining Company. 

In 1969, the E&LS stopped serving the Escanaba Paper Company during a strike (July 1, 1969) at the mill; in response, the mill's owners built a new connection to the C&NW and Soo Line and cut car movements on the E&LS more than five-fold in two years, from 2,200 carloads in 1968 to 449 in 1970. The E&LS continued skeleton service during the 1970s. In 1978, Hanna requested permission from the ICC to abandon the railroad.

1978 to 2009
On October 6, 1978, Hanna Mining Company sold the E&LS Railroad to John C. Larkin and his father Wade Larkin, businessmen from Minneapolis who had organized a National Railway Historical Society passenger excursion on the railroad earlier in the decade. He planned to return the railroad to profitability by reducing labor costs and entering the business of leasing boxcars to other railroads. Shortly thereafter, the boxcar leasing market collapsed. Additionally, with the Milwaukee Road going bankrupt in 1977, it planned to abandon its trackage in Michigan, consisting largely of a route between Ontonagon and Green Bay, Wisconsin. This plan would break the E&LS's connections at Channing, as well as end rail service to the shippers on the Milwaukee Road lines. One of these shippers, Champion Paper, which operated a mill in Ontonagon, approached the E&LS with a proposal for the railroad to buy the Milwaukee Road track to Ontonagon.

Purchasing ex-Milwaukee Road, C&NW, and Soo Line trackage
The E&LS was able to reach an agreement with Milwaukee Road's bankruptcy court to take control of the Ontonagon route, as well as additional trackage south. They were backed by many of the line's shippers and the states of Michigan and Wisconsin, but opposed by the C&NW, which wanted to retain iron ore transport from the Groveland Mine in Randville, Michigan, and Hanna Mining, the former owner of the E&LS and owner of the Groveland Mine. The C&NW and Milwaukee Road had previously shared service to the Groveland Mine under a decades-long agreement between the two, called the Menominee Range Iron Ore Pool. By 1979, the mine impacted 31,000 of the 50,000 cars moved over the Milwaukee Road's tracks in the area, a level of traffic so high that Larkin publicly stated that the E&LS would not make a profit without it. The ICC, and a US court, ruled in E&LS' favor.

On March 10, 1980, the E&LS formally bought the ex-Milwaukee Road between Ontonagon through Channing south to Iron Mountain. It also obtained a lease-to-own agreement of the tracks south from Iron Mountain to Green Bay; this section was purchased in 1982. Upon purchase, the E&LS immediately began rebuilding its new trackage, which had been neglected by the Milwaukee Road in the years leading up to its bankruptcy. Major funding came from the state of Michigan, which paid $1.6 million (equivalent to $ in ) to install new ties on the track to Ontonagon.

In November 1981, the E&LS bought additional trackage, this time a branch line from Channing north to Republic. In 1985, it bought a branch from Crivitz, Wisconsin, on the Green Bay line, east to Marinette, Wisconsin, and Menominee, Michigan. During 1987 and 1988, the line to Ontonagon had its lightweight rails replaced with new, heavier rails. 

In 1986, the E&LS connection track to the C&NW RR was built from a switch just south of Lineville Road in Howard, Wisconsin, to the C&NW Railroad's Howard Industrial Park siding line. This ultimately allowed the E&LS to discontinue operations south of Bond Road in Green Bay in 1993. This connection was the result of a construction agreement Between the E&LS and the C&NW that was executed on November 27, 1985, which provided joint access to the Howard Industrial Park. Two of the contracts executed then allowed tenants of Howard Industrial Park a choice of competing railroads for shipping service. The E&LS mainline was stubbed off in September 2007, removing the track from Bond Street to the Oakland Avenue Yard in Green Bay, Wi. 

On June 24, 1991, E&LS bought a  ex- Soo Line (ex-Duluth, South Shore & Atlantic) branch line from Sidnaw, on the Ontonagon line, east to Nestoria. 

The following year (1992), the E&LS mainline from Channing to Wells was taken out of service, with access to Escanaba retained via a new trackage rights agreement with the Wisconsin Central Railroad (now Canadian National Railroad), under which the E&LS was granted access their main line from Pembine, Wisconsin, to North Escanaba.

On April 20, 1995, E&LS bought a short branch line between Stiles Junction, Wisconsin, just north of Green Bay, to Oconto Falls from the C&NW. In 2005, the Wisconsin Department of Transportation provided a $2.01 million (equivalent to $ in ) grant to rebuild E&LS trackage from Crivitz north to the Michigan state line. This was the last section of mainline track that had not seen a complete rebuild since it was bought in 1980. 

These recent branch line acquisitions are used by the E&LS to store rolling stock for third parties.

Post-2009 and track closures
After the closure of the Smurfit-Stone Paper Mill in Ontonagon in 2009, the Escanaba and Lake Superior abandoned  of track between Ontonagon and milepost 395 one mile east of Rockland in 2011, severing the railroad's closest trackage to Lake Superior. The remaining track between Rockland and Mass City is used for third-party long term car storage. The sidings between Escanaba & Channing are used for long term car storage. The E&LS and the Michigan Department of Natural Resources consummated a rail banking/interim trail use agreement on or about October 28, 2014, for the abandoned portion of the E&LS rail line between milepost 395 at Rockland and Ontonagon. The abandoned segment is now the Ontonagon to Rockland Trail. 

The northernmost customer ships logs from an open air transload in the yard near the junction of East Branch Road and Depot Road in Mass City.

Rolling stock

The E&LS has been running a private passenger excursion yearly for invited guests and online customers since exiting passenger service on December 12, 1956. Themes of trips run have been Shippers Special Train, American Honors Society, NRHS and Great Lakes Western passenger special. E&LS handed off the North Woods Explorer train to the Soo Line at Pembine, who then took it to Sault Ste. Marie and then the Algoma Central trip to the Agawa Canyon on May 24, 1992. 

These specials necessitated two special runs between the engine shops at Wells and the E&LS mainline at Pembine over Canadian National Railroad trackage from North Escanaba to Powers to Hermansville and finally to Pembine.

Shippers Special
The Shippers Special Train usually runs late spring-early summer from Pembine south to Howard and then back north to Channing. There the train stops in Channing for a short crew change and then train goes as far as Mass City. The Shippers Special Train did not run in 2020.

American Honors Society Excellence In Education
The American Honors Society train ran on the LS&I with little known of its running from 2010 to 2014. The Honors Train departs Eagle Mills and runs to the ore dock and returns. Several cars were used from E&LS and Lake Superior Railroad Museum with diesels supplied by the LS&I railroad. A coach seen running in the train, marked Wisconsin & Southern Railroad Co. (ELS marks), #1001 and City of Horicon was also seen in several year's trains.

E&LS owned or leased passenger equipment
Below is the E&LS rolling stock, many of which are used for the recent trains run behind E&LS engines S-12 #300 and GP-38 #400.

Leased power
After acquiring the Milwaukee Road line from Green Bay to Ontonagon, the E&LS needed more power to run their trains. The railroads and leasers were: Conrail, Green Bay & Western, Lake Superior & Ishpeming, Milwaukee Road, Erie Mining and Soo Line. 

Several of the Conrail units leased ended up being leased for several years and then purchased by E&LS.

Active motive power

In 1985, the first EMD diesel, a GP-38 (E&LS 400) was purchased, followed shortly by additional GP-38s (ex-Conrail ELS 401 & 402) and 4 SD9s (1220-1224). In 2003, the railroad bought two SD-40-2s (ex-Electro-Motive Diesel Leasing E&LS 500 & 501), and, unusually, an FP7 (ELS 600) two years later. The FP7 was originally a Milwaukee Road FP7, then was bought by the Wisconsin Southern, and sold to the E&LS. The SD9s except for 1223 have been retired as of 2020. 1223 still operates in Wells and Escanaba, but it has been restricted from mainline service ever since an inspection found that the prime mover was failing. The engine can regularly be seen switching out E&LS customers in that area, and at the car maintenance facility in Escanaba, or at the E&LS engine shop at Wells, moving the stored engines and cars. 

In early January 2020, the railroad bought the ILSX SD40-2 #1344 and later in the year re-numbered it 502. The trucks from the since decommissioned SD-40-2, E&LS 500, were replaced with the original worn-out trucks on E&LS 502. They were the original silver trucks from when the engine was a Union Pacific SD40-2. In May 2020, E&LS bought a former GTW/BNSF Railway EMD SD-40 and numbered it 503.

Gallery

More

Inactive motive power
When it began operations, the E&LS used steam locomotives purchased second hand from other railroads in the Midwest. It bought a new Shay locomotive for logging service in 1904, followed by various locomotives from Baldwin. The E&LS first diesel locomotive, a Baldwin VO-1000, was purchased in 1946. The E&LS continued buying new and used Baldwins for the next several decades. Some notable mentions are the E&LS 300, the engine that can often be seen running the Shippers Special train.

Other locomotives include the Baldwin RS-12s 207-217 series. 10 RS-12s have either been sold off or put in a deadline at the E&LS Wells Facility. Other engines are the E&LS Shark Nose Baldwin's, originally from the Delaware & Hudson RR (D&H), numbered 1205 & 1216. Other notable mentions are engines 100 & 101, a pair of DS44-660s. The 101 can still be seen in Wells with its GN inspired paint scheme. The railroad also owns two Ex-Wisconsin & Calumet (WICT) F7As & F7Bs. There were several other engines, the 201, 202, & 204. These were the DS44-1000s.

Facilities, yards, and lines

Engine shops
 Wells
 Escanaba old Harnischfeger (P&H Crane) facility

Railroad yards
 Channing
 Crivitz repair-in-place (RIP) railcar facility
 Iron Mountain

Engine housing facilities
 Channing
 Crivitz
 Menominee
 Wells

Bulk transfer and wood yards
 Amasa
 Crivitz (2)
 Floodwood - bulk transfer
 Iron Mountain - bulk transfer
 Mass City
 McConnell Landing - station name
 Pembine (2)
 Randville
 Sidnaw, Mi - bulk transfer
 Sobieski

Interchange locations
The E&LS interchanges with the Canadian National Railroad in several different locations:
 North Escanaba, Michigan
 Howard, Wisconsin
 Pembine, Wisconsin
 Marinette, Wisconsin

Trackage rights
In late 2014, the E&LS and Canadian National Railway entered into a switching agreement to switch customers of CN in Marinette and Menominee. All traffic is given to the E&LS at Marinette; E&LS delivers loads or empties from both railroad's customers in those communities. This created a big costs and time savings for both railroads as it greatly simplified operations in these twin cities.

The E&LS RR has trackage rights on several parts of the Canadian National Railroad.
 Howard, to North Green Bay Yard in Green Bay, Wisconsin (These once extended to the Milwaukee's Oakland Avenue Yard, in downtown Green Bay via the WC, past the C&NW Green Bay station)
 Pembine to North Escanaba

Existing stations

As of January 2022:
 Crivitz - former Milwaukee and Northern Railway Company then Milwaukee Road depot built in 1883. Now owned by E&LS. This area was previously referred to as Ellis Junction.
 Iron Mountain - former Milwaukee and Northern Railway Company then Milwaukee Road depot built in 1914. Now owned by E&LS.
 Ontonagon - former Ontonagon and Brule River Railroad then Milwaukee Road depot built in ?. Now owned by ? .

Section houses:
 Randville
 Sidnaw

See also

References

External links

Bridgehunter - E&LS topic
Engine List - E&LS - RRpicturesarchive
Escanaba & Lake Superior Customers

B1G - The Big Train - railroadfan.com Escanaba & Lake Superior Railroad (ELS)
E&LS RR web site — official corporate site
Dolly Madison - Parlor Observation car
Escanaba & Lake Superior - public facebook group, 3.1k members

Michigan railroads
Railway companies established in 1900
Wisconsin railroads